Their First LP is the debut studio album by the Spencer Davis Group, released in the UK and Europe in June 1965. It peaked at number 6 on the UK Albums Chart. Although never released in its original incarnation in the US, a majority of the tracks from this album were later released in various compilations of the band marketed to US audiences.

Release
Their First LP features the group's first three singles, "Dimples", "I Can't Stand It" and "Every Little Bit Hurts". Whilst "Dimples" missed the charts, the other two briefly entered the charts, though didn't peak above the Top 40. The fourth single, "Sitin' and Thinkin'" was released in July 1966, but only in the Netherlands. The final single, "It's Gonna Work Out Fine" was only released in New Zealand in July 1967.

Despite being released at the beginning of June 1965, Their First LP didn't enter the UK Albums Chart until the first week of January 1966, when their single "Keep On Running", included on their second album, was in the charts. It reached its peak three weeks later and spent a total of eight week in the album chart.

Track listing

Personnel
 Spencer Davis – vocals, guitar, harmonica
 Steve Winwood – lead vocals, guitar, harmonica, piano
 Muff Winwood – vocals, bass guitar
 Pete York – drums
 Kenny Salmon – organ (4, 8)
 Peter Asher – piano (5)
 Millie Small – vocals (5)

Charts

References

1965 debut albums
The Spencer Davis Group albums
Albums produced by Chris Blackwell
Fontana Records albums